Lambskin may refer to:

Lambskin (sheepskin), the skin of a young sheep
Lambskin condom, made from natural lamb intestines